Euphaedra persephona is a butterfly in the family Nymphalidae. It is found in the Douala region  of Cameroon.

References

Butterflies described in 1983
persephona
Endemic fauna of Cameroon
Butterflies of Africa